The Government Laboratory High School is a school located in Dhanmondi, Dhaka, Bangladesh. The school was established on 3 September 1961. It is a boys' school .

History

The principal of the adjacent Govt. Teachers' Training College, Muhammad Osman Gani, sought to establish a facility to assist his trainees practice teaching. From this idea, Government Laboratory High School was created. The school was inaugurated in 1961 by the then Director of the Department of Public Instruction (D.P.I), Muhammad Shamsul Haque. The first headmaster was Khan Muhammad Salek, who went on to serve for 12 years.
Below is a list of the first teachers at the school, upon its opening.
 Khan Muhammad Salek (Headmaster)
 A. B. Mofizuddin Ahmed (Assistant Headmaster)
 Sirazul Haq Khan
 Muhammad Zafar Ali
 Abdur Rashid
 Muhammad Zahirul Huq
 Muhammad Nurul Islam
 A. B. M. Nurul Islam
 Muksedur Rahman Hawladar
 Muhammad Sharifuddin
 Khabir Uddin Ahmed
 Muhammad Waliullah
 Muhammad Sadat Ali
 Sri Suranjan Dutta

Headmasters 
 Late Khan Muhammad Saleque  (19611973), (First headmaster and founder)
 Hafiz Uddin Ahmed (19731978)
 Zafar Ali Khan (19781980)
 Md. Zafar Ali (19801980)
 Muhammad Muhibullah (19801986)
 Muhammad Nurul Huq Bhuiya (19871988)
 Muhammad Rabiul Islam Khan (19891991)
 Muhammad Zahirul Haque (19911994)
 Muhammad Habibullah Khan (19951997)
 Muhammad Momtazur Rahman (19971998)
 Muhammad Abdus Sobhan (19982000)
 Md. Nasir Uddin (20002001)
 Rashid Uddin Zahid (20012003)
 Abul Hasanat Faruque (20012003)
 Syed Hafizul Islam (20042007)
 A.K.M. Mustafa Kamal (20072010)
 Md. Abdul Khaleque (20102011)                            
 Md. Abu Sayeed Bhuiyan (20112014)
  Md. Abdul Khaleque (20142018)
 Md. Abu Sayeed Bhuiyan (2019present)

Gallery

References

External links 
 

Dhanmondi
Educational institutions established in 1961
Schools in Dhaka District
1961 establishments in East Pakistan